"No Hero" is a song recorded by Italian singer-songwriter Elisa for her ninth studio album, On (2016)."No Hero" is the tenth track on the album and serves as the lead single.

Live performances
Elisa performed "No Hero" for the first time live as a guest performer at the Sanremo Music Festival 2016 on 12 February 2016.

Chart performance

Weekly charts

Certifications and sales

References

2016 singles
2016 songs
Dance-pop songs
Songs written by Elisa (Italian singer)
Elisa (Italian singer) songs
Sugar Music singles